Sleepwalker is a 2011 Hong Kong film produced, written and directed by Oxide Pang. It premiered in Hong Kong on 3 November 2011.

Cast
Angelica Lee
Charlie Yeung
Huo Siyan
Li Zhonghan
Paw Hee-ching
Kent Cheng

References

External links

Hong Kong mystery thriller films
Films directed by Oxide Pang
2010s Hong Kong films